John Joseph Carney (November 10, 1866 – October 19, 1925), also known as Handsome Jack, was a professional baseball player in the late 19th century. He was born in Salem, Massachusetts, United States in 1866, and made his debut with the Washington Nationals on April 24, 1889. His last game, with the Milwaukee Brewers, was on October 4, 1891, and he died in 1925 in Litchfield, New Hampshire. In his three-year career, he also played with the Buffalo Bisons, the Cincinnati Kelly's Killers, and the Cleveland Infants, and his positions were first base and outfield. Carney's best performance was with the Infants in 1890, with whom he had a batting average of .348.

External links

1866 births
1925 deaths
Sportspeople from Salem, Massachusetts
19th-century baseball players
Major League Baseball first basemen
Washington Nationals (1886–1889) players
Buffalo Bisons (PL) players
Cleveland Infants players
Cincinnati Kelly's Killers players
Milwaukee Brewers (AA) players
Cornell Big Red baseball coaches
Baseball players from Massachusetts
Salem (minor league baseball) players
Manchester Farmers players
Manchester Maroons players
Kansas City Cowboys (minor league) players
Charleston Seagulls players
Toledo White Stockings players
Toledo Swamp Angels players
Terre Haute Hottentots players
Grand Rapids Rippers players
Grand Rapids Gold Bugs players
Kansas City Blues (baseball) players
Toronto Canucks players
Manchester Manchesters players
Concord Marines players
Nashua (minor league baseball) players
Sioux City Packers players
Utica Pent-Ups players
Utica Utes players
Haverhill Hustlers players
Kansas City Blues (baseball) managers